Muhammad Ali and Mac Foster fought each other in a fifteen-round boxing match in Tokyo on April 1, 1972. Ali won the fight on points  through a unanimous decision.

References

Foster
1972 in boxing
April 1972 sports events in Asia
Boxing in Japan